The Babymetal World Tour 2016: Legend Metal Resistance (stylized as BABYMETAL WORLD TOUR 2016 LEGEND - METAL RESISTANCE -) was the third worldwide concert tour by Japanese band Babymetal. Supporting their second album Metal Resistance (2016), the tour ran from April 2, 2016 to September 20, 2016, taking place in Japan, the United States, and several countries in Europe. The tour commenced the day after the worldwide release of Metal Resistance on April 1, 2016.

Background 
On , a YouTube video was posted on the band's official channel for the previously untitled album, announced with its April 1 release dubbed "Fox Day". Simultaneously, a 2016 world tour was also announced, with its planned final performance date at Tokyo Dome. On June 3, 2016, another date was announced for Tokyo Dome, extending the tour to September 20. The first American leg of the tour was confirmed shortly afterwards, with the band announcing tour dates set on the East Coast and planning later dates on the West Coast.

Tour dates for the European leg and second American leg of the tour were announced on the band's website on March 1, 2018, including a performance at Download Festival in Paris. Prior to the commencement of the American leg, the band made their first appearance on American television, performing "Gimme Chocolate!!" on The Late Show with Stephen Colbert. As of May 6, 2016, most shows for the North American leg were sold out, with the remaining shows limited in tickets, notable since Japanese music, despite being the world's second-largest music industry, has little international following.

Development 
As stated by Moa Kikuchi, the band's goal for the tour was to bring metal music to people regardless of their nationality, gender, or age. According to Yui Mizuno, the band members will "grow as a bigger band by experiencing this upcoming world tour so that [they] can come back to Japan and play at a huge venue as Tokyo Dome". Suzuka Nakamoto stated the desire to develop the new songs from Metal Resistance.

We think our songs and performances are developed by experiencing how the audience react and get excited at our shows. In our world tour, we'll be performing new songs from the new album so we're looking forward to see how we brush up and grow by taking in everything from every new performance we do.

Critical response 
Graham Hartmann of Loudwire positively reviewed the band's performance in New York City on May 4, 2016. Describing the concert as "stripped-down" and featuring highlights from their first two albums, he called the show "refreshing" how little production was put on the performance, noting how the vocal performance was not perfect. Regardless, he praised the girls' choreography and the instrumentals of the supporting Kami Band. Ben Ratliff of The New York Times described the set list as becoming "a little more knowing, though no less weird", calling "Amore" a highlight of the show, while noting that the appeal for the band was "energy and melody, and the work of skilled songwriters". Jason Roche of L.A. Weekly described the show in Los Angeles on July 15 as "more of a community center lock-in party than a Friday night out getting drinks and watching a band", highlighting Nakamoto's vocal performance. Although he praised the vocals that of Mizuno and Kikuchi, he stated that their stage presence is highlighted more by their "endless energy". He also noted that the show ran for a full 80 minutes with no break between sets, while the audience "stuck with the band through every song, their energy level never wavering".

Broadcast and recording 
The concert at Wembley Arena on April 2 was broadcast live to 24,000 people in Japan at Zepp Sapporo, Zepp Fukuoka, and delayed to Tsutaya O-East, which screened for an audience of 12,000. Japanese television station WOWOW broadcast the concert at Wembley Arena, as well as the performance at the 2016 Rock in Japan Festival on August 6, and both shows at Tokyo Dome on September 19 and 20. These shows were also released as live audio and video albums Live at Wembley and Live at Tokyo Dome. The concert at Wembley Arena then premiered on television in the United Kingdom on Sky Arts on July 6, 2019.

Tour dates

Notes

References

External links
 Official Babymetal website

2016 concert tours
Babymetal concert tours
Concert tours of North America
Concert tours of the United States
Concert tours of Europe
Concert tours of the United Kingdom
Concert tours of France
Concert tours of Germany
Concert tours of Asia
Concert tours of Japan